Santhinikethanam Model Higher Secondary School (SMHSS) is the higher secondary school located in the village of Sooranad, Kerala, India. It is run by the Smhss.org Patharam Educational & Cultural Society.

External links

References

Schools in Kollam district
High schools and secondary schools in Kerala